Gunnar Palm (22 February 1915 – 26 October 1994) was a Swedish equestrian. He competed in two events at the 1952 Summer Olympics.

References

External links
 

1915 births
1994 deaths
Swedish male equestrians
Olympic equestrians of Sweden
Equestrians at the 1952 Summer Olympics
Sportspeople from Uppsala
20th-century Swedish people